Herochroma mansfieldi is a moth of the family Geometridae first described by Louis Beethoven Prout in 1939. It is found in Yunnan and Hubei, both in China.

The length of the forewings is about 29 mm.

References

Moths described in 1939
Pseudoterpnini
Moths of Asia